Hurricane Carmen was the most intense tropical cyclone of the 1974 Atlantic hurricane season. A destructive storm with widespread impacts, Carmen developed from a tropical wave that emerged from Africa toward the end of August. The disturbance traveled westward, and organized as a tropical depression east of the Lesser Antilles on August 29. The storm moved through the Caribbean Sea, and in an environment conducive to intensification, it quickly strengthened to its initial peak intensity as a Category 4 hurricane on the Saffir–Simpson Hurricane Scale. Carmen moved ashore on the Yucatán Peninsula, where, despite striking a sparsely populated region, it caused significant crop damage and killed several people. Before the storm's arrival, officials had set up several evacuation centers, and many residents had moved to higher ground.

Upon entering  the Gulf of Mexico, Carmen turned northward and re-intensified as it approached the United States. Initially threatening the major city of New Orleans, it veered westward and made landfall on the marshland of southern Louisiana, eventually dissipating over eastern Texas on September 10. Tropical cyclone watches and warnings had been issued for the storm, and approximately 100,000 residents left their homes and sought shelter. Damage was lighter than first feared, but the sugar industry suffered substantial losses. Throughout its course, the hurricane killed 8 people and caused $162 million in damage. Due to the severity of the storm, the name Carmen was retired from the list of Atlantic tropical cyclone names.

Meteorological history

The origins of Hurricane Carmen can be traced to a weather disturbance over Africa during the middle of August 1974. The disturbance moved slowly westward with little convective activity initially, although upon entering the Atlantic Ocean, it spawned a tropical wave within the Intertropical Convergence Zone. The wave had intensified and broadened by August 25, and it eventually split into two components, the northernmost of which consolidated into an organized storm system. Due to favorable outflow from an anticyclone nearby, the depression gradually strengthened as it moved through the Lesser Antilles. It attained tropical storm status on August 30, south of Puerto Rico, and was named Carmen by the National Hurricane Center. At first, the storm's proximity to Hispaniola prevented further strengthening, but by August 31, it had managed to intensify into a Category 1 hurricane on the Saffir–Simpson Hurricane Scale. As Carmen passed south of Jamaica, an eye feature briefly appeared.

On September 1, the hurricane began to rapidly deepen over warm waters of the Caribbean Sea; by 18:00 Coordinated Universal Time (UTC), it had strengthened to Category 4 intensity. Continuing westward, the storm passed north of Swan Island later that day. Early on September 2, a double eyewall appeared on satellite imagery. Carmen's forward movement gradually slowed as the storm took a west by north direction, and it reached its initial peak intensity with maximum sustained winds of 150 mph (240 km/h), accompanied by a central barometric pressure of 928 mbar (hPa; 27.4 inHg). Atmospheric steering currents became increasingly weaker, and Carmen slowed to a drift. Later on September 2, the hurricane made landfall on the Yucatán Peninsula; its northern jog spared Belize City from a direct hit. The storm's center passed a few miles north of Chetumal, Quintana Roo.

The cyclone drifted inland, deteriorating to a tropical storm on September 3. About a day later, Carmen emerged into the Gulf of Mexico, where it nearly stalled. Turning northward, the storm regained hurricane strength on September 5. The storm then became a Category 4 hurricane again and reached its second peak intensity while located south of Louisiana; although the wind speeds were identical to that of its initial peak, the barometric pressure was slightly higher. Carmen weakened and veered westward before landfall, ultimately striking south-central Louisiana. After moving ashore, the hurricane quickly lost strength and late on September 9 degenerated into a tropical depression. The depression moved westward and soon dissipated over eastern Texas.

Preparations

Initial reactions to the approaching hurricane in the Yucatán Peninsula were regarded as calm by the United States media. Mexican officials declared an emergency alert by September 2, although they did not advise any evacuations. Meteorologists in the United States urged those living near the coast to move inland immediately. Fearing significant loss of life and property, the Red Cross began preparations for the approaching hurricane in Belize. The following day, the Mexican Army rushed to set up emergency operation centers and shelters in five cities. Mobile communication units and relief teams were prepared for deployment following the storm's passage. Many of the nearly 35,000 residents in and around the city of Chetumal evacuated to higher ground.

Although it initially threatened the United States city of New Orleans, the hurricane turned west prior to making landfall and spared the area from severe damage. Contrary to its actual path, forecasters predicted the hurricane to execute an eastward swerve toward Florida. Had the cyclone instead continued northward and traveled over Lake Pontchartrain, low-lying areas could have suffered "catastrophic" flooding. Over 100,000 residents of the Gulf Coast, mostly in Louisiana and Mississippi, evacuated in advance of the hurricane, causing heavy congestion on highways. About 60,000 people sought shelter in facilities across the New Orleans region, according to Red Cross officials.

Hurricane warnings were issued along the coast, while Coast Guard personnel went door-to-door on Grand Isle urging residents to leave the area. From there through the coast of southwestern Florida, small craft were advised to remain near shore due to rough seas. Offshore, workers were removed from oil rigs. Many Mississippi citizens, having experienced the destruction of Hurricane Camille just five years earlier, quickly left their coastal homes.

Impact
The storm spawned a tornado on Puerto Rico and triggered flash flooding, which collectively left over $2 million in damage. Winds approaching gale force affected several islands. Heavy rain fell on Hispaniola as the storm progressed westward, and on Jamaica, the storm caused three drownings. High winds and heavy rainfall were reported there and in Cuba. The hurricane damaged local reefs on the north shore of Jamaica during its passage. Killing one person in the state of Louisiana the total damage was close to an extra $175 million in cost.

Following the storm, the name Carmen was retired from the annually rotating list of hurricane names. However, due to a change in the naming scheme in 1979, it was not replaced by any particular name.

Yucatán Peninsula

Although Carmen made landfall as a powerful Category 4 hurricane, it caused significantly less damage than anticipated because it struck a sparsely populated region. However, torrential rainfall from the storm inundated farmland across the region, ruining rice crops. The fishing industry also sustained major losses. Communication with the hardest hit regions was lost following Carmen's passage; however, early reports stated that at least five people were injured. Several days later, officials in Mexico confirmed that three people had been killed by the storm. The city of Chetumal was described as a "disaster", and hundreds of people were left homeless. More than 5,000 people in the city lost their belongings as a result of the storm. Officials in the area estimated that damage in Chetumal alone reached $8 million (1974 USD). Throughout the Yucatán Peninsula, Hurricane Carmen claimed four lives and wrought $10 million (1974 USD) in damage.

Following Carmen's passage, officials feared the worst for an area of 1,000 mi2 (2,590 km2) where communication was lost in Belize. A reconnaissance task force was sent out from Belize City the day after Carmen made landfall to assist any residents stranded by the storm. One person was killed off the coast of Belize after being washed off his boat by large swells produced by Carmen. Three other fishermen were listed as missing following similar incidents. Thousands of people moved from coastal areas inland to escape the storm. Crop damage in the country was reportedly severe.

United States
Carmen dropped moderate rainfall along its path, though the heaviest rainfall occurred well to the east of the storm's center, in southern Alabama and the northern Florida Panhandle. The hurricane's effects in Baton Rouge were confined to strewn debris and a few downed trees. Because Carmen moved ashore over uninhabited marshland, it caused far less damage than initially feared. Nonetheless, tidal flooding from the Gulf of Mexico and coastal bodies of water was severe. Freshwater flooding was less extreme. A large oak tree was overturned by high winds in the town of Jeanerette in Iberia Parish.

The storm's greatest impact was the loss of sugar cane crops in Louisiana. An estimated  of sugar cane in 16 parishes was damaged, and about 20 percent was completely ruined. After a tour of the affected area, then-Governor Edwin Edwards estimated crop damage alone at $400 million, although a more recent estimate placed total agricultural damage from the hurricane at $74 million. The sugar cane crop was crucial to the country's sugar supplies, rendering the losses "doubly bad", and sugar futures rose drastically after the storm. Other crops damaged by Carmen included soybeans, rice, and cotton.

Tidal action along the coast affected the balance of salinity in coastal marshes and water bodies. The sudden intrusion of saltwater stressed delicate plants. Fish, shrimp and oysters also suffered the ecological effects of Hurricane Carmen. Flooding on land caused some wildlife to drown. Several parks in Louisiana sustained damage, either from flooding or high winds; losses to Grand Island State Park in particular totaled $114,600. The oil and gas industry was also affected, and its estimated $24.7 million in losses resulted mainly from damage to equipment and offshore facilities. The storm diminished oil production by 1.4 million barrels when it shut down operations for 24 to 48 hours at various locations. Over 60,000 electric cooperative customers lost power.

The hurricane caused two fatalities in Louisiana: a utility repairman who was electrocuted while working on power lines damaged by strong winds, and a motorist who was involved in a storm-related traffic accident. Total monetary losses in the state was estimated at $150 million. Overall, the hurricane spawned four confirmed tornadoes. One touched down near Brandon, Mississippi, destroying a barn and causing other damage. Another struck Kaplan, Louisiana, injuring one person. The storm's effects in Mississippi were described as minimal and were mainly confined to minor traffic accidents during bouts of heavy precipitation. Light to moderate rainfall from the storm extended as far east as Florida and Georgia and as far west as Oklahoma and Texas.

In popular culture 
Hurricane Carmen was depicted in the 1994 movie Forrest Gump, in which the hurricane plays a major part in the movie's plot.

See also

 Other storms of the same name
 List of Category 4 Atlantic hurricanes
 List of retired Atlantic hurricane names
 List of wettest tropical cyclones in Alabama
 Hurricane Audrey (1957) – caused severe impacts in Louisiana and Mississippi
 Hurricane Laura (2020) – devastated Southwestern Louisiana
 Hurricane Delta (2020) and Hurricane Zeta (2020) – both also made landfall on the Yucatán Peninsula and in Louisiana

References

External links

 1974 Monthly Weather Review
 Carmen Rainfall Totals

Carmen
1974 in Mexico
Carmen 1974
Carmen 1974
Carmen 1974
Carmen 1974
Carmen 1974
Carmen
Carmen 1974
1974 in Alabama
Carmen 1974
1974 natural disasters in the United States
1974 in Puerto Rico
1974 in Mississippi
1974 in Louisiana